Haute Vallée de Chevreuse Regional Natural Park (French: Parc naturel régional de la haute vallée de Chevreuse) is a protected area in the Île-de-France region of northern France. It is a verdant rural area outside Paris, designated as a regional natural park because it contains a wide variety of unique historical sites.

Features
The parkland spans two departments, Yvelines and Essonne, and connects fifty-one separate communes along the Chevreuse valley of the river Yvette. The park's main office is located in Chevreuse in a medieval fortress, the Château de la Madeleine.

See also
 List of regional natural parks of France

References

External links
 Official park website 
 Official park website 

Regional natural parks of France
Geography of Essonne
Geography of Yvelines
Protected areas established in 1985
Tourist attractions in Île-de-France
Tourist attractions in Essonne
Tourist attractions in Yvelines
1985 establishments in France